Daya Shankar Kulshreshtha (born December, 1951) is an Indian theoretical physicist, specializing in formal aspects of quantum field theory, string theory, supersymmetry, supergravity and superstring theory, Dirac's instant-form and light-front quantization of field theories and D-brane actions and boson stars.

Education and career
Kulshreshtha obtained B.Sc. (1969) and M.Sc. (1971) degrees from Jiwaji University, Gwalior.  He received his Ph.D. in 1979 from the University of Delhi, under the supervision of R. P. Saxena. He worked as a postdoctoral researcher at the University of Kaiserslautern (1982–1984).  He then held a five-year position of a UGC-Research Scientist of the University Grants Commission of India at the University of Delhi (1986–1991) followed by a five year position at the University of Kaiserslautern, Germany (1990–1994) before being appointed a professor at the University of Delhi in 1994.

Research
Kulshreshtha's research focuses on formal aspects of quantum field theory, string theory, supersymmetry, supergravity and superstring theory. In particular, he studies the canonical structure, constrained dynamics and Dirac's instant-form and light-front quantization of field theory, string theory and D-brane actions using the Hamiltonian and path integral formulation as well as the BRST quantization.

External links
 Homepage
 University of Delhi profile
 
 INSPIRE-HEP Authors Profile

References

Living people
1951 births